Saint Nicholas Garden Canyon (Portuguese: Cânion do Horto São Nicolau) is a canyon in Arapoti, Paraná, Brazil. The canyon has been carved by Rincon Creek, a tributary of the Ash River. A Riparian forest flanks the canyon.

References

Canyons of Paraná
Landforms of Paraná (state)
Arapoti